is a Japanese composer and songwriter. He also known by the alias y@suo ohtani.

References

External links
  

1978 births
Japanese composers
Japanese lyricists
Japanese male composers
Japanese songwriters
Living people
Musicians from Yamagata Prefecture
People from Yamagata Prefecture